George Turyasingura is an Anglican bishop in Uganda: he has been Bishop of East Rwenzori since 2018.

Turyasingura was born in 1968 in Nyamucengere, Kabale District. He was educated at Rwengobe  School and Uganda Christian University. He was ordained in 1998. Turyasingura was consecrated  on 7 January 2018.

References

Anglican bishops of East Rwenzori
21st-century Anglican bishops in Uganda
Living people
Uganda Christian University alumni
People from Kabale District
1968 births